Jean-Benjamin François de la Borde (5 September 1734 – 22 July 1794) was a French composer, writer on music and fermier général (farm tax collector). Born into an aristocratic family, he studied violin under Antoine Dauvergne and composition under Jean-Philippe Rameau. From 1762 to 1774, he served at the court of Louis XV as premier valet de la chambre, losing his post on the death of the king. He wrote many operas, mostly comic, and a four-volume collection of songs for solo voice, Choix de chansons mises en musique illustrated by Jean-Michel Moreau. Many of the songs from the collection were later published individually through the efforts of the English folksong collector Lucy Etheldred Broadwood. His Essai sur la musique ancienne et moderne was published in 1780. La Borde was guillotined during the French Revolution in 1794.

Operas

In popular culture
La Borde's role at court is embellished in a fictional book series about police commissioner "Nicolas Le Floch" by Jean-François Parot. The stories have also been adapted for a television series in which La Borde appears regularly.

References 

French male classical composers
French opera composers
Male opera composers
French ballet librettists
1734 births
1794 deaths
Musicians from Paris
Music historians
French people executed by guillotine during the French Revolution
18th-century classical composers
Fermiers généraux
18th-century French composers
18th-century French male musicians
Writers about music